David Quincy (born 13 September 1939, Battle, Sussex), better known as Dave Quincy (and also billed as Dave Quincey), is an English saxophonist and composer who was a founder-member of British jazz-rock bands If and Zzebra.

Before joining If, Quincy had played in the early 1960s with Jet Harris, and with Chris Farlowe and the Thunderbirds from August 1965 to February 1967 where he played with Dave Greenslade (who would also later briefly join If when their first line-up split, before going on to form his own group). Quincy then recorded two albums with Manfred Mann Chapter Three before recording for JJ Jackson, where he met up with Dick Morrissey and Terry Smith, with whom he would form If. When If broke up, Quincy went on to become a founder-member of Zzebra, with Terry Smith.  Repertoire Records now release all the If recordings in their catalogue, and in 2014 released Groovicity, a recent recording by a quartet led by Quincy.  In 2016, the label released If 5, being a record by a reformed version of If, led by original members Dave Quincy and Terry Smith.

Discography

With Manfred Mann
1969: Chapter Three - Manfred Mann's Chapter Three 
1970: Chapter Three Vol. 2 - Manfred Mann's Chapter Three

With If
1970:If
1970:If 2
1971:If 3
1972:If 4
1972:Waterfall
2016:If 5 (Repertoire)

With Zzebra
1974: Zzebra
1975: Panic (Polydor)
1975: Take It Or Leave It 
2001: Lost World (recorded live in 1975)

As sideman
1970: J. J. Jackson's Dilemma
1971: Cast of Thousands - Leigh Stephens
1982: In London - Teresa Brewer
1986: Altitude - Jamie Talbot

Solo
1974: Can You Keep It Up for a Week? (film score)

With Groovicity
2014: Groovicity (Dave Quincy/Guy Gardner Quartet) (Repertoire Records)

References

1939 births
Living people
English jazz saxophonists
English rock saxophonists
British male saxophonists
English session musicians
Place of birth missing (living people)
If (band) members
21st-century saxophonists
21st-century British male musicians